Dachi is a town of Zhenba County in the Qin Mountains of southwestern Shaanxi province, China,  from the border with Sichuan and  west of the county seat. , it has one residential community and four villages under its administration.

References

Township-level divisions of Shaanxi
Zhenba County